= Heath Ledger: His Beautiful Life and Mysterious Death =

Biography of Heath Ledger

- Author: John McShane
- Cover artist: Copyright © REX features
- Language: English language
- Subject: Heath Ledger (life, career, death)
- Genre: Biography
- Publisher: John Blake Publishing Ltd
- Publication date: 7 April 2008 (UK); 15 June 2008 (U.S.)
- Publication place: United Kingdom
- Media type: Paperback
- Pages: 288
- ISBN: 978-1-84454-633-6
- OCLC: 191891127

Heath Ledger: His Beautiful Life and Mysterious Death is the first book-length biography of Australian actor Heath Ledger since his death on 22 January 2008, written by British journalist John McShane. It was published on 7 April 2008 by John Blake, in London, and on 15 June 2008, in the United States.
